Quassia ( or ) is a plant genus in the family Simaroubaceae. Its size is disputed; some botanists treat it as consisting of only one species, Quassia amara from tropical South America, while others treat it in a wide circumscription as a pantropical genus containing up to 40 species of trees and shrubs. The genus was named after a former slave from Suriname, Graman Quassi in the eighteenth century. He discovered the medicinal properties of the bark of Quassia amara.

Distribution
Members of the genus are found in the Tropics throughout the world. Countries and regions where species are native include: Andaman Islands, Angola, Bangladesh, Belize, Benin, Bismarck Archipelago, Borneo, North and Northeast Brazil, Burkina, Cabinda, Cambodia, Cameroon, Central African Republic, Chad, Colombia, Comoros, Congo, Costa Rica, El Salvador, Equatorial Guinea, Gabon, Gambia, Ghana, Guatemala, Guinea, Guinea-Bissau, Gulf of Guinea Islands, Honduras, India, Ivory Coast, Kenya, Laos, Leeward Islands, Liberia, Madagascar, Malaya, Mali, Central, Southeast and Southwest Mexico, Myanmar, New Guinea, Nicaragua, Niger, Nigeria, Northern Territory, Panamá, Philippines, Queensland, Senegal, Sierra Leone, Solomon Islands, Sri Lanka, Sudan, Sulawesi, Sumatera, Tanzania, Togo, Trinidad-Tobago, Uganda, Venezuela, Vietnam, Windward Islands, Zambia, and Zaïre.

The plant is naturalised in the following places: Cuba, Dominican Republic, Haiti, Jamaica, Jawa, and Puerto Rico.

List of accepted species
Accepted species of the genus, as of February 2021, are:

Quassia africana 
Quassia amara 
Quassia arnhemensis 
Quassia baileyana 
Quassia bidwillii 
Quassia borneensis 
Quassia crustacea 
Quassia gabonensis 
Quassia harmandiana 
Quassia indica 
Quassia pohliana 
Quassia sanguinea 
Quassia schweinfurthii 
Quassia undulata 
Quassia versicolor 

There are also taxa that have not been assigned a formal status:

Quassia sp. 'Moonee Creek', unplaced – Australia
Quassia sp. 'Mount Nardi', unplaced – Australia

Uses
It is the source of the quassinoids quassin and neo-quassin.

References

External links
 
 

 
Sapindales genera
Plant toxin insecticides